Okulovskaya is a rural locality (a village) in Ilezskoye Rural Settlement, Tarnogsky District, Vologda Oblast, Russia. The population was 92 as of 2002.

Geography 
Okulovskaya is located 35 km northeast of Tarnogsky Gorodok (the district's administrative centre) by road. Golchevskaya is the nearest rural locality.

References 

Rural localities in Tarnogsky District